Hebo is an unincorporated community in Tillamook County, Oregon, United States. For statistical purposes, the United States Census Bureau has defined Hebo as a census-designated place (CDP). The census definition of the area may not precisely correspond to local understanding of the area with the same name. The population of the CDP was 231 at the 2000 census.

Geography

US Forest Service
The Hebo Ranger District is based in Hebo on Highway 22.  It is the northern (and smaller) district for Siuslaw National Forest.  Much of the land surrounding Hebo is public land managed by Siuslaw National Forest.

Demographics

As of the census of 2000, there were 231 people, 94 households, and 65 families residing in the CDP. The population density was 141.8 people per square mile (54.7/km2). There were 123 housing units at an average density of 75.5 per square mile (29.1/km2). The racial makeup of the CDP was 90.91% White, 3.03% Native American, 3.90% from other races, and 2.16% from two or more races. Hispanic or Latino of any race were 5.63% of the population.

There were 94 households, out of which 23.4% had children under the age of 18 living with them, 56.4% were married couples living together, 7.4% had a female householder with no husband present, and 29.8% were non-families. 23.4% of all households were made up of individuals, and 7.4% had someone living alone who was 65 years of age or older. The average household size was 2.46 and the average family size was 2.79.

In the CDP, the population was spread out, with 22.9% under the age of 18, 7.4% from 18 to 24, 19.9% from 25 to 44, 34.6% from 45 to 64, and 15.2% who were 65 years of age or older. The median age was 44 years. For every 100 females, there were 104.4 males. For every 100 females age 18 and over, there were 100.0 males.

The median income for a household in the CDP was $37,250 and the median income for a family was $52,500. Males had a median income of $40,694 versus $21,250 for females. The per capita income for the CDP was $16,053. None of the families and 4.4% of the population were living below the poverty line, including no under-eighteens and 14.3% of those over 64.

See also
Mount Hebo
Mount Hebo Air Force Station

References

Census-designated places in Oregon
Unincorporated communities in Tillamook County, Oregon
Census-designated places in Tillamook County, Oregon
Unincorporated communities in Oregon